(My sighs, my tears), 13,  is a church cantata by Johann Sebastian Bach. He composed it in Leipzig for the second Sunday after Epiphany and first performed it on 20 January 1726.

History and words 
Bach wrote the cantata in his third year in Leipzig for the Second Sunday after Epiphany. The prescribed readings for the Sunday were taken from the Epistle to the Romans, we have several gifts, each is unique, as part of the body of Christ (cf also I Corinthians 12)(), and from the Gospel of John, the Marriage at Cana. The text is taken from Georg Christian Lehms' annual of cantatas, published in Darmstadt in 1711. The single idea from the gospel is the word of Jesus: "Mine hour is not yet come". The text is divided into two parts of three movements each, the first dealing with the distress of someone feeling abandoned, the second with hope for God's help. Both parts are closed by a chorale. Movement 3 is the second stanza of Johann Heermann's hymn "", the closing chorale is the final stanza of Paul Fleming's "". According to Alfred Dürr, it is unlikely that they were performed before and after the service, considering the brevity of the work.

Scoring and structure 

The cantata in six movements is intimately scored for four soloists, soprano (S), alto (A), tenor (T), and bass (B), a four-part choir (SATB) in the chorales, two recorders (Fl), oboe da caccia (Oc), two violins (Vl), viola (Va), and basso continuo. The continuo is playing throughout.

Music 

The cantata is opened by an aria, a lamento accompanied by soft recorders and the dark sound of the oboe da caccia which leads frequently. It is a da capo form, but the middle section is again divided in two parts. In it, the voice shows the "" (road to death) by several downward steps. Dürr points out that this composition "illustrates how the imagination of the Baroque musician is particularly fired by texts dealing with sighing and pain". The following short secco recitative ends as an arioso on the words "" (plead in vain). In the chorale, the woodwinds play the cantus firmus in unison with the alto voice, while the strings play independent figuration in F major, illustrating hope, although the text says that hope is not yet in sight. John Eliot Gardiner terms it "confident diatonic harmonies" as an "optimistic, wordless answer" to the voice's "prayer for comfort".

A second expressive recitative leads to a second aria, which is accompanied by violin I and the recorders, playing in unison an octave higher. The lamenting text of the beginning "" (groaning and pitiful weeping) is stressed by intervals such as augmented second, diminished fifth and diminished seventh. The ritornello has two distinctly different parts, a lamenting section and a hopeful one, full of fast runs and passages. In the middle section, the text "" (he who looks towards heaven) is accented by an octave leap upwards in the voice and upwards runs in the instruments, contrasting the downward line in movement 1. The closing chorale is a four-part setting of the melody of "" by Heinrich Isaac, which is featured twice in Bach's St Matthew Passion in movements 10 and 37.

Recordings 

 Bach Cantatas Vol. 1 – Advent and Christmas, Karl Richter, Münchener Bach-Chor, Münchener Bach-Orchester, Edith Mathis, Anna Reynolds, Peter Schreier, Dietrich Fischer-Dieskau, Archiv Produktion 1971
 J. S. Bach: Das Kantatenwerk – Sacred Cantatas Vol. 1, Gustav Leonhardt, Tölzer Knabenchor, King's College Choir, Leonhardt-Consort, soloist of the Tölzer Knabenchor, Paul Esswood, Kurt Equiluz, Max van Egmond, Teldec 1972
 Die Bach Kantate Vol. 23, Helmuth Rilling, Gächinger Kantorei, Bach-Collegium Stuttgart, Arleen Augér, Carolyn Watkinson, Adalbert Kraus, Walter Heldwein, Hänssler 1981
 Bach Edition Vol. 9 – Cantatas Vol. 4, Pieter Jan Leusink, Holland Boys Choir, Netherlands Bach Collegium, Ruth Holton, Sytse Buwalda, Knut Schoch, Bas Ramselaar, Brilliant Classics 1999
 Bach Cantatas Vol. 19: Greenwich/Romsey, John Eliot Gardiner, Monteverdi Choir, English Baroque Soloists, Joanne Lunn, Richard Wyn Roberts, Julian Podger, Gerald Finley, Soli Deo Gloria 2000
 J. S. Bach: Complete Cantatas Vol. 17, Ton Koopman, Amsterdam Baroque Orchestra & Choir, Sandrine Piau, Bogna Bartosz, Paul Agnew, Klaus Mertens, Antoine Marchand 2001
 J. S. Bach: Cantatas Vol. 42, Masaaki Suzuki, Bach Collegium Japan, Rachel Nicholls, Robin Blaze, Gerd Türk, Peter Kooy, BIS 2008
 J. S. Bach: Cantatas for the Complete Liturgical Year Vol. 8: "Meine Seufzer, meine Tränen" - Cantatas BWV 13 · 73 · 81 · 144, Sigiswald Kuijken, La Petite Bande, Gerlinde Sämann, Petra Noskaiová, Christoph Genz, Jan van der Crabben, Accent 2008

References

External links 
 
 Meine Seufzer, meine Tränen BWV 13; BC A 34 / Sacred cantata Leipzig University
 Cantata BWV 13 Meine Seufzer, meine Tränen history, scoring, sources for text and music, translations to various languages, discography, discussion, Bach Cantatas Website
 Chapter 12 Bwv 13 – The Cantatas of Johann Sebastian Bach, A listener and student guide by Julian Mincham, 2010
 Luke Dahn: BWV 13.6 bach-chorales.com

Church cantatas by Johann Sebastian Bach
1726 compositions